Prunus spinosa, called blackthorn or sloe, is a species of flowering plant in the rose family Rosaceae. The species is native to Europe, western Asia, and regionally in northwest Africa. It is locally naturalized in New Zealand, Tasmania, and the Pacific Northwest and New England regions of the United States.

The fruits are used to make sloe gin in Britain and patxaran in Spain. The wood is used to make walking sticks, including the Irish shillelagh.

Description

The fruit, called a "sloe", is a drupe  in diameter, black with a purple-blue waxy bloom, ripening in autumn and traditionally harvested – at least in the UK – in October or November, after the first frosts. Sloes are thin-fleshed, with a very strongly astringent flavour when fresh.

Blackthorn usually grows as a bush but can grow to become a tree to a height of 6 m. Its branches usually grow forming a tangle.

Prunus spinosa is frequently confused with the related P. cerasifera (cherry plum), particularly in early spring when the latter starts flowering somewhat earlier than P. spinosa. They can be distinguished by flower colour, pure white in P. spinosa, creamy white in P. cerasifera. In addition, the sepals are bent backwards in P. cerasifera, but not in P. spinosa. They can be distinguished in winter by the shrubbier habit with stiffer, wider-angled branches of P. spinosa; in summer by the relatively narrower leaves of P. spinosa, more than twice as long as broad; and in autumn by the colour of the fruit skin purplish black in P. spinosa and yellow or red in P. cerasifera.

Prunus spinosa has a tetraploid (2n=4x=32) set of chromosomes.

Like many other fruits with pits, the pit of the sloe contains trace amounts of hydrogen cyanide.

Etymology

The specific name  is a Latin term indicating the pointed and thornlike spur shoots characteristic of this species. The common name "" is due to the thorny nature of the shrub, and possibly its very dark bark: it has a much darker bark than the white-thorn (hawthorn), to which it is contrasted.

Other cognate forms are Frisian and Middle Low German , Middle Dutch ; Modern Dutch ;  Modern Low German /, ; Danish .

The names related to 'sloe' come from the common Germanic root . Compare Old Slavic, Bulgarian, Macedonian, Ukrainian and Russian  (sliva, Ukr. slyva), West Slavic / Polish ; plum of any species, including sloe —root present in other Slavic languages, e.g. Bosnian, Croatian, Montenegrin and Serbian  / .

Distribution and habitat
The species is native to Europe, western Asia, and locally in northwest Africa. It is also locally naturalized in New Zealand, Tasmania and eastern North America.

Ecology

The foliage is sometimes eaten by the larvae of Lepidoptera, including the small eggar moth, emperor moth, willow beauty, white-pinion spotted, common emerald, November moth, pale November moth, mottled pug, green pug, brimstone moth, feathered thorn, brown-tail, yellow-tail, short-cloaked moth, lesser yellow underwing, lesser broad-bordered yellow underwing, double square-spot, black hairstreak, brown hairstreak, hawthorn moth (Scythropia crataegella) and the case-bearer moth Coleophora anatipennella. Dead blackthorn wood provides food for the caterpillars of the concealer moth Esperia oliviella.

Uses 

The shrub, with its long, sharp thorns, is traditionally used in Britain and other parts of northern Europe to make a cattle-proof hedge.

The fruit is similar to a small damson or plum, suitable for preserves, but rather tart and astringent for eating, unless it is picked after the first few days of autumn frost. This effect can be reproduced by freezing harvested sloes.

Since the plant is hardy, and grows in a wide range of conditions, it is used as a rootstock for many other species of plum, as well as some other fruit species.

Flavor 
The juice is used in the manufacture of fake port wine, and used as an adulterant to impart roughness to genuine port, into the 20th century. In rural Britain a liqueur, sloe gin, is made by infusing gin with sloes and sugar. Vodka can also be infused with sloes.

In Navarre, Spain, a popular liqueur called  is made with sloes. In France a liqueur called  or épinette or troussepinette is made from the young shoots in spring rather than from fruits in autumn. In Italy, the infusion of spirit with the fruits and sugar produces a liqueur called bargnolino (or sometimes prunella). In France, eau de vie de prunelle[s] is distilled from fermented sloes in regions such as the Alsace and vin d'épine is an infusion of early shoots of blackthorn macerated with sugar in wine. Wine made from fermented sloes is made in Britain, and in Germany and other central European countries. It is also sometimes used in the brewing of lambic beer in Belgium.

Food 
Sloes can also be made into jam, chutney, and used in fruit pies. Sloes preserved in vinegar are similar in taste to Japanese umeboshi. The juice of the fruits dyes linen a reddish colour that washes out to a durable pale blue.

The leaves resemble tea leaves, and were used as an adulterant of tea.

The fruit stones have been found in Swiss lake dwellings. Early human use of sloes as food is evidenced in the case of a 5,300-year-old human mummy (nick-named Ötzi), discovered in the Ötztal Alps along the Austrian-Italian border in 1991: a sloe was found near the remains, evidently with the intent to eat it before the man died.

Wood 
Blackthorn makes an excellent fire wood that burns slowly with a good heat and little smoke. The wood takes a fine polish and is used for tool handles and canes. Straight blackthorn stems have traditionally been made into walking sticks or clubs (known in Ireland as a shillelagh). In the British Army, blackthorn sticks are carried by commissioned officers of the Royal Irish Regiment; this is a tradition also in Irish regiments in some Commonwealth countries.

Inks 
Rashi, a Talmudist and Tanakh commentator of the High Middle Ages, writes that the sap (or gum) of P. spinosa (which he refers to as the ) was used as an ingredient in the making of some inks used for manuscripts.

A "sloe-thorn worm" used as fishing bait is mentioned in the 15th-century work, The Treatyse of Fishing with an Angle.

Culture 
In Middle English, slō has been used to denote something of trifling value.

The expression "" for a person with dark eyes comes from the fruit, and is first attested in A. J. Wilson's 1867 novel Vashti.

The flowering of the blackthorn may have been associated with the ancient Celtic celebration of Imbolc, traditionally celebrated on February 1 in Ireland, Scotland and the Isle of Man.

The name of the dark-coloured cloth prunella was derived from the French word , meaning sloe.

Notes

References

Bibliography

External links

 
 

spinosa
spinosa
Flora of Europe
Flora of Norway
Medicinal plants
Plants described in 1753
Fruit trees
Taxa named by Carl Linnaeus